Peru competed at the 2014 Winter Olympics in Sochi, Russia from 7 to 23 February 2014. Peru's team consisted of three athletes in two sports. The same three athletes represented the country at the 2010 Winter Olympics in Vancouver.

Competitors

Alpine skiing 

According to the quota allocation released on January 20, 2014, Peru had two athletes in qualification position.

Cross-country skiing 

According to the final quota allocation released on January 20, 2014, Peru had one athlete in qualification position. Carcelen broke his ribs and suffered contusions and was told by doctors he would miss the games. However he has decided to compete regardless. Carcelen finished in last place in the race, nearly 30 minutes behind the winner Dario Cologna of Switzerland.

Distance

See also
Peru at the 2014 Summer Youth Olympics

References

External links 
Peru at the 2014 Winter Olympics

Nations at the 2014 Winter Olympics
2014 Winter Olympics
Olympics